Alan David Rowan MacAuslan (1921 – 25 May 2018), was a British doctor who in 1945, while studying at St Thomas' Hospital, assisted at Bergen-Belsen concentration camp when he volunteered as a medical student. In 2005, at the age of 83, his story was reported in the BBC News.

See also
List of London medical students who assisted at Belsen

References

External links
Alan MacAuslan – Medical Student

20th-century British medical doctors
London medical students who assisted at Belsen
1945 in medicine
1921 births
2018 deaths